Hilma is a female given name that was in occasional use at the turn of the 20th century. The name was made popular by the German poet Friedrich Gottlieb Klopstock. The name was used in early 19th century Scandinavian literature, probably as a variant of Wilhelmina. It can also be a variant of the male name Hilmar or Hilmer.

People
Hilma Angered Strandberg (1855–1927), Swedish writer
Hilma Caldeira (born 1972), Brazilian volleyball player
Hilma Contreras (1913–2006), Dominican writer
Hilma Granqvist (1890–1972), Finnish anthropologist
Hilma Gabriella Jahnsson (1882–1975), Finnish lawyer
Hilma af Klint (1862–1944), Swedish artist and mystic
Hilma Räsänen (1877–1955), Finnish educator and politician
Hilma Swedahl (1870–1965), Swedish gold prospector
Hilma Valjakka (1881–1934), Finnish politician
Hilma Wolitzer (born 1930), American novelist

See also 
Helma
Helmi (disambiguation)
Wilhelmina (disambiguation)

Feminine given names
German feminine given names
Scandinavian feminine given names
Finnish feminine given names